Sunlight Express Airways, operating as Sunlight Air, is a Philippine-registered boutique airline based in Clark, Pampanga. It operates flights from its hub in Clark to Busuanga, Puerto Princesa, Caticlan, Panglao, Siargao, and Cebu using its fleet of three ATR 72-500s.

History
Sunlight Air was established on 22 July 2019 as a chartered airline. It began operations on 17 December 2020, with an inaugural flight from Ninoy Aquino International Airport in Manila to Busuanga in Palawan. The airline promotes itself using the tagline, "Bringing Warmth to the Skies!".

The airline currently operates a fleet of three ATR 72-500s and provides domestic non-scheduled airline services from its hub in Clark, Pampanga to Busuanga and Puerto Princesa in Palawan, Boracay in Caticlan, Siargao in Surigao del Norte, Panglao in Bohol, and Cebu City. The airline is linked to Sunlight Hotels and Resorts group, which owns upper and mid-range hotels on Palawan and Busuanga Island in the western Philippines and offers travel packages inclusive of flights and accommodations to and from Sunlight Ecotourism Island Resort in Culion, Palawan.

Destinations
As of November 2022, Sunlight Air offers flights to the following destinations in the Philippines:

Fleet
As of December 2020, Sunlight Air's fleet consists of the following aircraft:

References

External links

Airlines of the Philippines
Airlines established in 2019
Companies based in Parañaque
Philippine companies established in 2019